Pepper X is a cultivar of Capsicum chili pepper bred by Ed Currie, creator of the Carolina Reaper. Pepper X resulted from several cross breedings that produced an exceptionally high content of capsaicin in the locules of the pepper. The exceptional pungency of the chili was developed over 10 years of cultivation. According to Currie, he started developing Pepper X as he found his favorite chili peppers too mild and wanted to have a pepper that had more heat while retaining the flavor.

Currie asserted that it is "two times as hot as the Carolina Reaper", which would make it the hottest pepper in the world with a Scoville scale of 3.18 million Scoville heat units (SHU), but this remains unconfirmed by Guinness World Records; the Carolina Reaper remains the hottest official chilli pepper (1,641,183 SHU), .

References 

Chili peppers
Capsicum cultivars